Sandro Floris (born 12 June 1965) is a former Italian sprinter who specialized in the 200 metres who won eleven medals at the International athletics competitions, ten of these with national relays team. 

At the senior individual level he was European indoor champion in Glasgow 1990.

Biography
His personal best 200 metres time was 20.68 seconds, achieved in June 1996 in Rome. His personal best for the 100 metres time was 10.36 seconds, achieved in July 1994 in Nuoro.

Achievements

National titles
Floris won three national championships at individual senior level.

Italian Athletics Championships
100 m: 1994
200 m: 1989
Italian Athletics Indoor Championships
200 m: 1992

See also
 Italy national relay team

Notes

References

External links
 

1965 births
Living people
Sportspeople from Cagliari
Italian male sprinters
Olympic athletes of Italy
Athletes (track and field) at the 1988 Summer Olympics
Athletes (track and field) at the 1996 Summer Olympics
World Athletics Championships athletes for Italy
World Athletics Championships medalists
European Athletics Championships medalists
Athletics competitors of Fiamme Azzurre
Mediterranean Games gold medalists for Italy
Mediterranean Games bronze medalists for Italy
Mediterranean Games medalists in athletics
Athletes (track and field) at the 1987 Mediterranean Games
Athletes (track and field) at the 1991 Mediterranean Games
Athletes (track and field) at the 1997 Mediterranean Games
Italian Athletics Championships winners
20th-century Italian people